Egar is a surname. Notable people with the surname include:

Colin Egar (1928–2008), Australian Test cricket umpire
Shuli Egar, American comedian 
Ras Muhamad (born 1982), Indonesian reggae singer (born Muhamad Egar)

See also
Eager (disambiguation)
Eger (disambiguation)
Edgar (disambiguation)